The 183A Toll Road or 183A is a toll road in the Austin metropolitan area of the U.S. state of Texas.  The road includes sections in north Austin, Cedar Park, and Leander.  It provides a bypass for U.S. Route 183.  The road is owned and operated by the Central Texas Regional Mobility Authority.  The 183A Toll road is electronic only and has no cash toll booths.  Motorists driving without a toll tag will receive a bill in the mail payable within 30 days.  The tolled portion of the highway runs from US 183 near SH-45 to FM 2243 in Leander.

Route description
The 183A Toll Road starts in Austin at an interchange with US 183 and SH 45. The freeway runs north to a point near Fenway Park where US 183 turns off to the north-northwest. From that location, the toll road runs to the north through an area composed of residential subdivisions. Near Heritage Park, there is an interchange for Whitestone Boulevard near some commercial developments. Near the interchange with RM 2243, 183A turns to the northwest and ends at a connection with US 183 in Leander.

Tolls

Violation fees
If a TxTag holder (or customer of any other acceptable toll-tag) has a TxTag account with a negative balance, Municipal Services Bureau (MSB) will mail a separate bill with a higher fee.

Violation fees are fees added to an unpaid pay-by-mail bill. An unpaid bill can accrue up to $60 in fees after 90 days.

History
The first section of the toll road opened in March 2007 between RM 620 and RM 1431. As initial traffic was higher than expected, the toll road was extended 5 miles to the north. The Phase II extension opened on April 6, 2012 at a cost of $105 million. The 6.6 mile Phase III extension from Hero Way to north of SH 29 in Liberty Hill has been approved. Construction on Phase 3 began in April 2021, and the roadway is expected to open in early 2025. It will run on the current alignment of US 183 north of Leander.

Exit list

References

External links

 183A web site

183A toll road
183A toll road
Cedar Park, Texas
Toll Road
Transportation in Williamson County, Texas
Leander, Texas
2007 establishments in Texas